"Guaranteed" is a song by English musical group Level 42. It was released in 1991 on the album of the same name. It was the group's first single of the 1990s, and came two years after the group's previous single, "Take Care of Yourself".

Song
The song was written by Mark King, Mike Lindup, Gary Husband, and Wally Badarou, producer and secondary composer and musician of the group. The current guitarist was Allan Holdsworth. The vocals were composed by Mark King, on verses, and a duet with Mike Lindup falsetto on chorus. The song follows the same structure of the song "Two Hearts Collide", released in 1988 on the album Staring at the Sun.

Music video
This song has two different music videos, by the same director: "The Mill". All versions feature the song performances in two different places. The first version outside in the mountains, and the second in a white room. The second version has some parts of the first. The two versions feature Jakko Jakszyk on guitars. Guitarist Alan Holdsworth left the group after the album was completed.

Reception
It was the most successful track from the Guaranteed album. It reached the top 20 in the UK. It also enjoyed chart success in Europe.

Charts

References

1991 singles
Level 42 songs
Songs written by Mark King (musician)
Songs written by Mike Lindup
1991 songs
RCA Records singles
Songs written by Wally Badarou
Songs written by Gary Husband